A non-load bearing wall or non-bearing wall is a type of wall used in building construction that is not a load-bearing wall. That is, it is a wall that does not support the weight of structure other than the wall itself.

Walls that fall into this category include:
 Most interior walls 
 Infill wall
 Curtain wall (architecture)
 Partition walls

See also
Non-loadbearing

References